The National Tainan Second Senior High School (TNSSH) is a senior high school in North District, Tainan, Taiwan. It was established in May 1914 during the period of Japanese rule. It was the first senior high school in middle and southern Taiwan. The school is one of the most prestigious high schools in the city. As for the recent high school entry exam, which is mandatory for a student in Taiwan for attending high school, a student must have the top 10-11% mark in the test in order to gain admission to the school.

History

1914. Established as 

1988. The school commenced its semester with the new professional art class. It was the first professional art class in      
southern Taiwan. As the school began, one of the traditions of the school was also changed by enrolling the first female students into the new art program. 

1994. The new construction of the Science Building was completed, one year later; the astronomical observatory was also completed.

1996. In response to teachers and students seeking for more information in education and teaching material, the high school set up the internet connection with the information database in National Cheng Kung University. The school was the first one in Taiwan that had an internet connection with a university's academic database.

1998. The new construction of the Art Building was completed. It provided students another place to accomplish their goals within the art fields.

Notable alumni

Academics
Cho-yun Hsu, historian
Ong Iok-tek, scholar and activist

Politicians
Lin Bih-jaw, former Secretary-General to the President
King Pu-tsung, former Secretary-General of the National Security Council 
Lee Ming-liang, former Minister of the Department of Health
Wong Chung-chun, Member of the Legislative Yuan
Lee Chun-yee, Member of the Legislative Yuan
Shih Chih-ming, 11th and 12th Mayor of Tainan

Entertainers
ADian, drummer of 831
Ang Lee, filmmaker (transferred to National Tainan First Senior High School)
Jacky Wu, television show host and singer

See also
 Education in Taiwan

External links

 National Tainan Second Senior High School official website (Traditional Chinese)

1914 establishments in Taiwan
Educational institutions established in 1914
High schools in Taiwan
Schools in Tainan